Khoisa is a genus of moths in the family Gelechiidae.

Species
 Khoisa epicentra (Meyrick, 1909)
 Khoisa glauca (Janse, 1960)
 Khoisa panaula (Meyrick, 1909)
 Khoisa triloba (Janse, 1960)

References

Gelechiinae